Lingo is a British game show based on the American programme of the same name, the original iteration of the programme was made by Thames Television and Action Time for ITV, running for a single series with host Martin Daniels from 12 May to 14 July 1988. A revived version has also aired from 1 January 2021 hosted by Adil Ray.

In the revival version, ITV and Objective Media Group revived Lingo with new presenter Adil Ray. The bingo element has been eliminated in the revival, focusing instead entirely on the word guessing game. In September 2022, ITV premiered the spin-off Celebrity Lingo, with RuPaul (who is hosting a U.S. revival of Lingo for CBS that is also being filmed in Salford) as host.

Gameplay
The game is played between teams of two contestants, tasked with solving mystery words. The team in control is given the first letter of each mystery word and receives five attempts to guess and spell the word. After each guess, the team is told whether their guess contains letters that are in the mystery word and whether or not they are in the correct position. The two members of the team alternate taking each guess. 

If the team fails to identify the word within five guesses, fails to make a guess within a time limit, gives a misspelt or otherwise invalid word, control is passed to the opposing team and one of the correct letters is revealed.

Original
In the 1988 version (which was based on the original U.S. syndicated version), the game was played between two teams. They were each assigned a 25-space "Lingo card" (similar to American bingo) with odd or even numbers respectively with seven numbers on each card already marked. Each word was five letters in length and each correct guess awarded £50. The team would also be allowed to draw two balls from a hopper containing balls with the 18 remaining numbers on the card, two prize balls and three red balls. Drawn numbers were marked off on the team's Lingo card but drawing a red ball immediately ended the team's turn and passed control to their opponents. Forming a "Lingo" line of five numbers in a row vertically, horizontally or diagonally awarded a £100 bonus.

The team with the highest score at the end of the game advanced to the bonus round "No Lingo"; the team was given a new card with 16 spaces covered, arranged in a star shape along the diagonals, middle row and middle column (but excluding the centre space). Unlike the main game, the objective was to avoid forming a line of five in a row. The team once again had to solve mystery words (given the first letter and one additional letter) but were required to draw one ball for each guess taken and two more as a penalty if they ran out of guesses. The hopper initially contains 39 numbered balls consisting of the even figures from 2 to 80 (but excluding the ball corresponding to the centre space) and one silver ball. 

If the team drew a numbered ball, it was discarded and marked off if it appeared on their card. If the team draws the silver ball, they no longer have to draw any more numbers for the round and the ball is returned to the hopper. After each successful round, the team's pot is doubled and they are given the option to leave with their winnings or play another round. If the team forms a Lingo at any point, the game ends and the team's bonus winnings are reduced by half. Up to five rounds could be played, beginning with a base pot of £100 and progressing to the grand prize of £3,200, beginning with the second round, the ball corresponding to the centre space is added to the hopper.

Revival
The 2021 revival does not use any bingo mechanics and consists only of word guessing in various formats, beginning with three teams:

 Round 1 uses four-letter words worth £200 each. Each team solves four words each (three words each in Series 1), followed by a nine-letter puzzle word worth up to £300 but its value decreases as more letters are revealed.
 Round 2 switches to five-letter words worth £300 each. Each team solves three words each, followed by a ten-letter puzzle word worth up to £400 but its value decreases again as more letters are revealed. In this round, failures can be stolen by opposing teams. The team with the least amount of money after Round 1 goes first and the team with the least amount of money at the end of this round is eliminated.
 In Round 3, the one member of each team is assigned to four-letter words and the other member of each team is assigned to five-letter words respectively with each member receiving two words alternately. Each word is worth up to £500 but its value decreases by £50 for each attempt. Both the four-letter word and five-letter word games are followed by an eleven-letter puzzle word worth up to £750 but its value decreases again as more letters are revealed. Again, in this round, failures are passed on to the opposing team. The team with the least amount of money before each of the two games in this round goes first and the team in the lead at the end of this round advances to the Final.
 In the Final, the winning team has 90 seconds to solve three more words in order to claim their winnings. If the team cannot solve a word, they may pass and receive a new one. The team must first solve a four-letter word to claim half of their winnings, then a five-letter word to claim the entirety of their winnings and then a six-letter word to double their winnings or as of Series 3, at this point, the team is given the option to risk their winnings on a seven-letter word instead to win a £15,000 jackpot. The team may not pass on this one and they lose all of their winnings if they fail to solve the word.

On Celebrity Lingo, the rounds' values are increased to £500, £750 and £1,000 for words and £750, £1,000 and £1,500 for puzzles (played with eight-letter, nine-letter and ten-letter words respectively). Unlike the civilian version, losing teams receive a consolation prize of £1,000.

Transmissions

Original

Revival

Regular

Celebrity

See also
 Wordle

References

External Links
 
 
 

1988 British television series debuts
1980s British game shows
2020s British game shows
ITV game shows
Television shows produced by Thames Television
Television series by Fremantle (company)
Television series by All3Media
English-language television shows
British television series revived after cancellation
Bingo
British television series based on American television series